Dylan Moses (born May 25, 1998) is an American football linebacker who is a free agent. He played college football at Alabama and signed with the Jaguars as an undrafted free agent in 2021.

High school career
Moses originally attended University High School in Baton Rouge, Louisiana, before transferring to IMG Academy in Bradenton, Florida, for his senior season. As a senior, he was the Parade Magazine National Player of the Year and won the Butkus Award. A five star recruit, Moses originally committed to Louisiana State University (LSU) to play college football before changing to the University of Alabama.

College career
As a true freshman at Alabama in 2017, Moses played in 11 games with two starts and recorded 30 tackles, 1.5 sacks and one interception. He missed the 2018 Sugar Bowl and the 2018 College Football Playoff National Championship due to a broken foot. As a first year starter in 2018, Moses was a finalist for the Butkus Award. On the eve of the 2019 season, Moses suffered a knee injury during training and missed the entire season. He announced that he would return to Alabama for his senior season.

Professional career

On May 1, 2021, Moses signed with the Jacksonville Jaguars as an undrafted free agent. He was placed on the reserve/non-football injury list at the start of 2021 season. On April 11, 2022, Moses was released by the Jaguars.

References

External links
Alabama Crimson Tide bio

1998 births
Living people
Players of American football from Baton Rouge, Louisiana
African-American players of American football
American football linebackers
IMG Academy alumni
Alabama Crimson Tide football players
Jacksonville Jaguars players
21st-century African-American sportspeople